The 13th Virginia Infantry Regiment was an infantry regiment raised in central and western Virginia for service in the Confederate States Army during the American Civil War. It fought mostly with the Army of Northern Virginia.

Its commanders were Colonels George A. Goodman, Ambrose P. Hill, James B. Terrill, and James A. Walker; and Majors Charles T. Crittenden and John B. Sherrard.

The 13th Virginia completed its organization during the summer of 1861 with men from Winchester and Culpeper, Orange, Louisa, and Hampshire counties, and one company from Maryland. The original Companies B and E enlisted only for 6 months, the others for one year. At the end of that year, their service was extended for the duration of the war.

After fighting at First Manassas and in Jackson's Valley Campaign, it served in General Early's, W.Smith's, Pegram's, and J.A. Walker's Brigade. The 13th was prominent in the campaigns of the Army of Northern Virginia from the Seven Days' Battles to Cold Harbor, then it moved with Gen. Jubal Early to the Shenandoah Valley and later was involved in the Appomattox operations.

It reported 16 casualties at Cross Keys and Port Republic, 111 at Gaines Mill, 34 at Cedar Mountain, 46 at Second Manassas, 22 at Fredericksburg, and 36 at Chancellorsville. During the Gettysburg Campaign it was left at Winchester as provost guard. The unit sustained heavy losses at the Battle of Cedar Creek and surrendered at Appomattox Court House with 10 officers and 52 men.

See also

List of Virginia Civil War units
List of West Virginia Civil War Confederate units

Notes

References

Units and formations of the Confederate States Army from Virginia
Hampshire County, West Virginia, in the American Civil War
1861 establishments in Virginia
Military units and formations established in 1861
1865 disestablishments in Virginia
Military units and formations disestablished in 1865